Moto, Motos or MOTO may refer to:

Business
 Moto Hospitality, a chain of motorway service stations in the United Kingdom
 Moto Gold Mines, an exploration and mining company acquired by Randgold Resources
 Moto (restaurant), a restaurant in Chicago known for its "high-tech" food
Motorola Mobility, whose nickname was "Moto" during the feature-phone era before the rise of smartphones when the company was a division of Motorola
Motorola Moto, a brand of smartphones and smartwatches manufactured by Motorola Mobility

People
 Moto Hagio (born 1949), Japanese manga artist
 Hirokuni Moto (born 1970), Japanese boxer
 Iwa Moto, screen name of Filipino Japanese actress and model Aileen Iwamoto (born 1988)
 Kaoru Moto (1917–1992), U.S. Army soldier awarded the Medal of Honor
 Severo Moto Nsá (born 1943), opposition politician in Equatorial Guinea known as Severo Moto
 Yves Bitséki Moto (born 1983), Gabonese football goalkeeper
 Pablo Motos (born 1965), Spanish television show host and comedian
 Teresa Motos (born 1963), Spanish former field hockey player

Entertainment
Mr. Moto, a fictional Japanese secret agent
M.O.T.O. (short for Masters of the Obvious), a Chicago band
Motos, an arcade game released in 1985
Motos, a fictitious creature found in Will Self's novel The Book of Dave
Moto, one of the first two tribes featured in Survivor: Fiji
Girls on Top (album), a 2005 album by BoA, reissued under the title Moto
Moto Moto, a supporting character from the Madagascar franchise

Sports
 Motocross, a form of off-road motorcycle racing consisting of races called motos
 MotoGP and its divisions Moto1, Moto2 and Moto3
 Moto Club de São Luís, a Brazilian football club
 Moto Esporte Clube, a Brazilian football club

Other uses
 Moto, a genus of bugs in the tribe Harpactorini
 Moto (magazine), a Zimbabwean Catholic community newspaper 
 Shorthand for a small motorcycle or moped
 Moto, a Central American and Peruvian incarnation of the auto rickshaw

Acronyms
 MO/TO (Mail Order/Telephone Order) in card not present transaction processing

See also

 Motomoto (disambiguation), including Moto-Moto
 
 Motto (disambiguation)